Eila Orvokki Roine (born 26 November 1931 in Turku) is a Finnish actress. She worked for Tampereen Työväen Teatteri from 1951 until her retirement in 1994.

On television

Eila Roine is best known for her role as Kaija in a television series Heikki ja Kaija (1961–1971) in which she played opposite her husband, Vili Auvinen (1931–1996). She has also appeared in Rintamäkeläiset (1974) and in a teen series Pertsa ja Kilu (1975–1976), directed by Auvinen. For younger generations, she is known as "Eila-mummi" (Grandma Eila) in a children's program Pikku Kakkonen. In 2004, she was named the "Grandparent of the Year" by the Finnish Union for Senior Services. Although mostly known for her television and theatrical work, Roine has also appeared in several films during her career.

Personal life

Eila Roine was married to Vili Auvinen until his death in 1996. They have two sons together; director and actor Tommi Auvinen and lighting and sound designer Janne Auvinen. Roine's father Eero Roine (1904–1966) was an actor, as are her siblings Esko Roine and Liisa Roine.

Selected filmography

Pitkäjärveläiset (1951)
Poika eli kesäänsä (1955)
Musta rakkaus (1957)
Täällä Pohjantähden alla (1968)
Vodkaa, komisario Palmu (1969)
The Big Freeze (1993)
Kohtalon kirja (2003)
Juoksuhaudantie (2004)
Skavabölen pojat (2009)
Tie pohjoiseen (2012)
21 tapaa pilata avioliitto (2013)

References

External links 
 

1931 births
Living people
Actors from Turku
Finnish television actresses
Finnish film actresses